A Chief Councilor is the highest position within a District Council of the Bahamas. As provided within the Bahamas Local Government Act, the Chief Councillor is the representative of the council for all purposes. His or her tenure in office begins from the very day of election until the expiration of the term as prescribed by their respective District Council or if they so wish to resign (whichever may come sooner).

List of Chief Councillors 

Pinder’s Point Township

Jacquline Russell - Chairman 

Adrian Simmons -Deputy Chairperson

Lowell Pinder - Councillor 

Simon Lewis 

Quincy Bevans 

Alexio Forbes
 
Devon Russell 

Jason Smith
 
Lenise williams

EGHT MILE ROCK EAST

Kevin Wildgoose- Chairman 

Willis Baldwin Rolle

Yannick Rodger - Councillor 

Marvette Russell - Councillor
 
Rosney Cooper 

Malisa Dean-Strachan 

Felix Delancy 

Larry Wildgoose 

Newann Rolle 

EIGHT MILE ROCK WEST

Cristian  Palacious
Administrator IV
West Grand Bahama
Grand Bahama

Kevin Morris - Chairperson
  
Karen Leadon – Deputy Chairperson 

Jaron Harvey - Councillor

George Smith 

Denise Russell 

Alexander D. Rolle 

Chouen Stuart 

Tyrone D. Kemp 

Tadd S. Martin 

West Grand Bahama District
Local Government Practitioners

Ken Barr-Smith - Chairperson 

Morton Wilchcombe – Deputy Chairperson 

Keithora Munroe - Councillor

Patara Cooper 

Warren Saunders
 
Constance Hanna 

Mauva Hanna 

Carolyn Ferguson 

Marvin McQueen

CITY OF FREEPORT

Brenda  Colebrooke
Acting Director/Administrator 
City of Freeport Council 

KENDAL CULMER – CHIEF COUNCILLOR
 
ERNIE BARR – DEPUTY COUNCILLOR 

MARCO CAREY 

RAVANNO FERGUSON 

EARL NEELY 

ERRIS HUTCHESON 

DR. CHARLENE REID-MORRIS 

FRAZETTE GIBSON 

BERNARD GRANT

References 

Government of the Bahamas